Bromance is an American reality television series that originally aired on MTV from December 29, 2008 until February 2, 2009. It was developed as a spin-off of The Hills, and aired one six-episode season. The series focused on Brody Jenner, who appeared in its predecessor, and enlisted nine men to compete for the opportunity to win a close male friendship ("bromance") with him.

On February 2, 2009, it was revealed on air that Jenner had chosen Luke Verge as his new best friend. Along with Jenner's friendship and a spot in his entourage, Verge won a one year, rent-free stay in a fully furnished penthouse in downtown Los Angeles and a new Scion.

Contestants
Jacob Arenas, 21, from La Habra, California
Femi Borisade, 23, from Jacksonville, Florida
Chris Favis, 23, from Orlando, Florida
Michael Flatley, 26, from Matawan, New Jersey
Jered Getman, 22, from St. Cloud, Florida
Chris Purcell, 21, from Louisville, Kentucky
Alex Romanoff, 21, from Falmouth, Maine
Gary Vaughn, 24, from Mattapoisett, Massachusetts
Luke Verge, 22, from Medford, Massachusetts

Call-out order

 The contestant won the competition and a "bromance" with Brody Jenner
 The contestant was eliminated from the competition
 The contestant won that episode's reward challenge
 The contestant won a challenge that episode, but was not the team leader
 The contestant won two challenges in one episode
 The contestant withdrew from the competition

Reasons for elimination

References

External links
 Bromance at MTV.com
 

2008 American television series debuts
2009 American television series endings
2000s American reality television series
American television spin-offs
English-language television shows
MTV original programming
Television series by Ryan Seacrest Productions
Television shows set in Los Angeles
Reality television spin-offs
The Hills (TV series)